Lyapkin is a Russian masculine surname, its feminine counterpart is Lyapkina. Notable people with the surname include:

Dmitriy Lyapkin (born 1976), Kazakh football defender
Yuri Lyapkin (born 1945), Russian ice hockey player

Russian-language surnames